"You'll Always Be Loved by Me" is a song written by Ronnie Dunn and Terry McBride, and recorded by American country music duo Brooks & Dunn.  It was released in March 2000 as the third and final single from their album Tight Rope. It peaked at number 5, and is the only single from the album to reach the Top 10.  The title of its parent album Tight Rope is mentioned in this song.

Chart positions
"You'll Always Be Loved by Me" debuted at number 69 on the U.S. Billboard Hot Country Singles & Tracks chart for the week of March 18, 2000.

Year-end charts

References

Allmusic

2000 singles
Brooks & Dunn songs
Songs written by Terry McBride (musician)
Songs written by Ronnie Dunn
Song recordings produced by Byron Gallimore
Arista Nashville singles
1999 songs